Florida is the third-most populous state in the United States. Its residents include people from a wide variety of ethnic, racial, national and religious backgrounds.  The state has attracted immigrants, particularly from Latin America. Florida's majority ethnic group are European Americans, with approximately 65% of the population identifying as White. National ethnic communities in the state include Cubans, who migrated en masse following the revolution in the mid 20th century. They have been joined by other immigrants from Latin America, and Spanish is spoken by more than 20% of the state's population, with high usage especially in the Miami-Dade County area.

Population
With a population of 21.5 million according to the 2020 census, Florida is the most populous state in the Southeastern United States, and the second-most populous state in the South behind Texas. Within the United States, it contains the highest percentage of people over 65 (17.3%), and the 8th fewest people under 18 (21.9%).

Net domestic migration

Race/ethnicity

2020 census
According to the 2020 census, the racial distributions are as follows; 51.5% Non-Hispanic White, 26.6% of the population are Hispanics or Latino (of any race), 14.5% African American, 4% Native American, and 2.3% Asian, Oriental and other.

2010 census
According to the 2010 census, the racial distributions are as follows; 53.5% Non-Hispanic White, 25.6% of the population are Hispanic Americans or Latino (of any race), 15.2% African American (includes Afro-Caribbeans), 4.5% Native American, 2.0% Asian and others  Florida has one of the largest African-American populations in the country, and has the second-highest Latino population on the East Coast outside of New York state. Its ethnic Asian population has grown rapidly since the late 1990s; the majority are South Asians, Filipinos, Vietnamese, ethnic Chinese. The state has some federally recognized Native American tribes, such as the Seminoles in the southeastern part of the state.

2018 American Community Survey

According to the 2018 US Census Bureau estimates, Florida's population was 74.7% White (53.3% Non-Hispanic White), 16.0% Black or African American, 2.8% Asian, 0.3% Native American and Alaskan Native, 0.1% Pacific Islander, 3.3% Some Other Race, and 2.9% from two or more races. The White population continues to remain the largest racial category as Hispanics in Florida primarily identify as White (81.9%) with others identifying as Some Other Race (11.3%), Multiracial (3.4%), Black (2.8%), American Indian and Alaskan Native (0.3%), Asian (0.1%), and Hawaiian and Pacific Islander (0.1%). By ethnicity, 26.1% of the total population is Hispanic-Latino (of any race) and 73.9% is Non-Hispanic (of any race). If treated as a separate category, Hispanics are the largest minority group in Florida.

Birth data
''Note: Births in the table exceed 100% because some Hispanics are counted both by their ethnicity and by their race, giving a higher overall number.

Languages

, 73.36% of Florida residents age 5 and older spoke English at home as a primary language, while 19.54% spoke Spanish, 1.84% French Creole (mostly Haitian Creole), 0.60% French and 0.50% Portuguese. In total, 26.64% of Florida's population age 5 and older spoke a mother language other than English.

Florida's public education system identified more than 200 first languages other than English spoken in the homes of students. In 1990, the League of United Latin American Citizens (LULAC) settled a class action lawsuit against the state Florida Department of Education with a consent decree that required educators to be trained in teaching English for Speakers of Other Languages (ESOL).

Article II, Section 9, of the Florida Constitution provides that "English is the official language of the State of Florida." This provision was adopted in 1988 by a vote following an Initiative Petition.

A Miami accent has developed among persons born and/or raised in and around Miami-Dade County and a few other parts of South Florida. It is more prominent among Hispanics (especially Cuban Americans and other Latino groups, influenced by the Spanish language).

Religion

Florida residents identify as mostly of various Protestant groups. Roman Catholics make up the single largest denomination in the state. Florida residents' current religious affiliations are shown in the table below:
Christianity 70%
Protestantism 46%
Evangelical Protestant 24%
Mainline Protestant 14%
Historically Black Protestant 8%
Catholicism 21%
Mormonism 1%
Jehovah's Witness 1%
Other Christian 1%
Non-Christian Faiths 6%
Judaism 3%
Other religion  3%
Unaffiliated 24%

Veterans
There were 1.6 million veterans in Florida in 2010, representing 8% of the total population.

Migration

In 2013, most net migrants come from 1) New York, 2) New Jersey, 3) Pennsylvania, and 4) the Midwestern United States; emigration is higher from these same states. For example, about 50,000 moved to New York; but more than 50,000 people moved from New York to Florida.

References 

 
Florida